iCarly: iSoundtrack II is the second and final soundtrack album of the Nickelodeon television series iCarly. It was released on January 24, 2012 as the follow-up album to iCarly.

It features Miranda Cosgrove's single "Dancing Crazy" from her EP High Maintenance, and Jennette McCurdy's single "Generation Love" from her self-titled debut album.

Track listing

Charts

References

ICarly
Television soundtracks
2012 soundtrack albums